Leptura aethiops is a species of beetle in the family Cerambycidae. It was described by Poda in 1761.

References

Lepturinae
Beetles described in 1761
Taxa named by Nikolaus Poda von Neuhaus